Chile Open may refer to:
 Chile Open (golf)
 Chile Open (tennis)